Heyday: the BBC Radio Sessions 1968–69 is an album by English folk rock band Fairport Convention first released in 1987. As its title suggests, it consists of live versions of songs recorded for John Peel's Top Gear radio programmes.

Track listing

Side one
"Close the Door Lightly When You Go" (Andersen) – 2:56
"I Don't Know Where I Stand" (Mitchell) – 3:40
"Some Sweet Day" (Bryant, Bryant) – 2:18
"Reno, Nevada" (Farina) – 2:18
"Suzanne" (Leonard Cohen) – 5:27
"If It Feels Good, You Know It Can't Be Wrong" (Hutchings, Thompson) – 3:12

Side two
"I Still Miss Someone" (Johnny Cash, Roy Cash jr) – 2:37
"Bird on a Wire" (Cohen) – 2:36
"Gone, Gone, Gone" (Everly, Everly) – 2:10
"Tried So Hard" (Clark) – 2:48
"Shattering Live Experience" (Nicol) – 3:19
"Percy's Song" (Bob Dylan) – 5:34

Bonus tracks on 2002 edition
"You Never Wanted Me" (Jackson C. Frank) – 3:18
"Nottamun Town" (traditional) – 3:37
"Fotheringay" (Sandy Denny) – 3:01
"Si tu dois partir" (Bob Dylan) – 2:28
"Cajun Woman" (Richard Thompson) – 2:47
"Autopsy" (Sandy Denny) – 4:26
"Reynardine" (traditional) – 4:24
"Tam Lin" (traditional) – 7:49

Personnel
Musicians:
 Ashley Hutchings –  bass
 Martin Lamble – drums
 Richard Thompson – guitar
 Simon Nicol – guitar
 Ian Matthews, Richard Thompson, Sandy Denny – vocals
 Ric Grech - Violin on Cajun Woman and Si Tu Dois Partir
 Dave Swarbrick - Violin on Reynardine and Tam Lin
 Dave Mattacks - Drums on Reynardine and Tam Lin
Additional personal:
 Joe Boyd – liner notes
 Bernie Andrews – producer (tracks side 1: 1 to 3, 5, 6, side 2: 3, 6)
 Johnny Beerling – producer (tracks side 2: 2)
 Keith Stewart – producer (tracks side 1: 4, side 2: 1, 4, 5)
 Ashley Hutchings, Frank Kornelussen, Joe Boyd – compilation

References

Sandy Denny albums
Fairport Convention live albums
1987 live albums
Island Records live albums
Hannibal Records albums
Peel Sessions recordings